Of Mist and Melting is the second album by American guitarist and composer Bill Connors recorded in 1977 and released on the ECM label.

Critical reception
The Allmusic review by Paul Kohler awarded the album 3 stars calling it "An atmospheric jazz album".

Track listing
All compositions by Bill Connors.

 "Melting" - 11:33   
 "Not Forgetting" - 6:33   
 "Face in the Water" - 6:25   
 "Aubade" - 9:38   
 "Cafe Vue" - 5:40   
 "Unending" - 7:33

Recorded at Talent Studio in Oslo, Norway in December 1977

Personnel
Bill Connors — guitar
Jan Garbarek — tenor saxophone
Gary Peacock — bass
Jack DeJohnette — drums

References

ECM Records albums
Bill Connors albums
1978 albums
Albums produced by Manfred Eicher